The Prue Two was an American high-wing, two-seat glider that was designed and built by Irving Prue, first flying in 1959.

Design and development
Prue designed the Prue Two as a high-performance two-seater, completing it and flying it in 1959.

The aircraft was of all-metal construction, except for its fiberglass nose cone. The wing was of a  span, employed a NACA 63-618A airfoil and featured large dive brakes. The wing was a three-piece design, with a centre section and two wing tips. Due to its large wing area it was nicknamed "Aluminum Overcast". The tail was a conventional low tail, in contrast to Prue's favoured V-tail on earlier designs. The landing gear was a retractable monowheel.

The Prue Two was the basis for the Prue IIA, which first flew in October 1964 and was used to set several world multi-place records.

Operational history
Soaring Magazine reported in 1983 that Prue still owned the machine and was still flying it at that time. The Federal Aviation Administration reports that it was destroyed and removed it from their aircraft register 10 February 1992.

Specifications (Prue Two)

See also

References

1950s United States sailplanes
Homebuilt aircraft
Aircraft first flown in 1959